Sekirišče (in older sources also Sekiršče) is a small settlement north of the road that leads from Rob to Krvava Peč in the Municipality of Velike Lašče in central Slovenia. The municipality is part of the traditional region of Lower Carniola and is now included in the Central Slovenia Statistical Region.

Name
The settlement was first attested in written sources in 1484 as Szekiritza, and in 1485 as Szekiricza. The name Sekirišče is derived from the Slavic nickname Sěkyra (related also to the place names Sekirn in Austria, Sekeřice in the Czech Republic, etc.). The name is unlikely to refer to a place cleared by an ax, as sometimes suggested.

Mass grave
Sekirišče is the site of a mass grave associated with the Second World War. It contains the remains of unidentified victims.

References

External links
Sekirišče on Geopedia

Populated places in the Municipality of Velike Lašče